The Safavid order, also called the Safaviyya, was a  tariqa (Sufi order) founded by the Kurdish mystic Safi-ad-din Ardabili (1252–1334). It held a prominent place in the society and politics of northwestern Iran in the fourteenth and fifteenth centuries, but today it is best known for having given rise to the Safavid dynasty. While initially founded under the Shafi'i school of Sunni Islam, later adoptions of Shi'i concepts such as the notion of the Imamate by the children and grandchildren of Safi-ad-din Ardabili resulted in the order ultimately becoming associated with Twelverism.

Founder and foundation
Safī al-Din grew up in Ardabil, but left it for lack of adequate teachers, traveling to Shiraz and then Gilan. In Gilan, he became the disciple of Zahed Gilani, leader of the Zahidī Sufi order.  He eventually became Zahid's chief disciple and married his daughter.  Upon Zahed Gilani's death, the Zahidiyyah came under Safī ad-Din's leadership and was renamed the Safawiyyah.

Safī al-Din's importance is attested in two letters by Rashid-al-Din Hamadani. In one, Rashid al-Din pledges an annual offering of foodstuffs.  In the other, Rashid al-Din writes to his son, the governor of Ardabil, advising him to show proper consideration to the sheikh.

Growth of the order
After Safī al-Din's death, leadership of the order passed to his son, Sadr al-Dīn Mūsā, and subsequently passed down from father to son. By the mid-fifteenth century, the Safawiyyah changed in character and became militant under Shaykh Junayd and Shaykh Haydar, launching jihads against the Christians of Georgia. The later Safawiyyah is considered "ghulat", meaning it had messianic beliefs about its leadership and Shi'ite antinomian practices outside of the orthodox norm of Twelver Islam.

Haydar's grandson, Ismail, further altered the nature of the order when he founded the Safavid empire in 1501 and proclaimed Twelver Shi'ism the state religion, at which point he imported ulama largely from Lebanon and Syria to make the Safavid practices orthodox.

See also
 Safavid dynasty family tree
 Safvat as-safa
 Safavid dynasty
 Musha'sha'iyyah, a rival Shi'a sect

References

Ja'fari jurisprudence
 
Shia Islamic branches
Sufi orders
Twelver Shi'ism
Shia Sufi orders